Mangla Devi Talwar was an Indian politician. She was a Member of Parliament, representing Rajasthan in the Rajya Sabha the upper house of India's Parliament as a member of the Indian National Congress.

References

1910 births
Year of death missing
Rajya Sabha members from Rajasthan
Indian National Congress politicians from Rajasthan
Women in Rajasthan politics
Women members of the Rajya Sabha